Laheda Parish was a rural municipality of Estonia, in Põlva County. It had a population of 1,355 on 1 January 2009 and an area of 91.47 km².

Ridali Airfield was located in Laheda Parish.

Settlements
Villages
Himma
- Joosu
- Lahe
- Mustajõe
- Naruski
- Pragi
- Roosi
- Suurküla
- Tilsi
- Vana-Koiola
- Vardja

References

External links